The Canyon of Light is a 1926 American silent Western film directed by Benjamin Stoloff and written by John Stone and William Conselman. It is based on the story "The Cañon of Light" by Kenneth Perkins published in Argosy, March 6-April 3, 1926. The film stars Tom Mix, Dorothy Dwan, Barry Norton, Ralph Sipperly, Will Walling and Carmelita Geraghty. The film was released on December 5, 1926, by Fox Film Corporation.

Plot 
During World War I, Ricardo Deane is killed fighting for the American Expeditionary Forces on the Western Front. After the war, Deane's family invites his friend Tom Mills to their ranch on the Mexico–United States border. However, Mills discovers that Deane's brother-in-law Ed Bardin is working as a bandit and disguising himself as Mills. After the gang is apprehended, Mills and Ricardo's widow Concha fall in love.

Cast   
 Tom Mix as Tom Mills
 Dorothy Dwan as Concha Deane
 Barry Norton as Ricardo Deane
 Ralph Sipperly as Jerry Shanks
 Will Walling as Cyrus Dean 
 Carmelita Geraghty as Ellen Bardin
 Carl Miller as Ed Bardin
 Duke R. Lee as Joe Navardo
 Tony the Horse as Tony

References

External links
 

1926 films
1926 Western (genre) films
Fox Film films
Films directed by Benjamin Stoloff
American black-and-white films
Silent American Western (genre) films
Western Front (World War I) films
American World War I films
Films set in Mexico
1920s English-language films
1920s American films